FC Krasnogvardeyets Moscow was a Russian football team from Moscow. It played professionally from 1995 to 1997. Their best result was 14th place in Zone 3 of the Russian Third League in 1996 and 1997.

External links
  Team history at KLISF

Association football clubs established in 1994
Association football clubs disestablished in 1999
Defunct football clubs in Moscow
1994 establishments in Russia
1999 disestablishments in Russia